Cowcaddens subway station serves the Cowcaddens area of Glasgow, Scotland. It is located on the north side of the city centre and is served by the Glasgow Subway.

History
It was opened in 1896 and comprehensively modernised between 1977 and 1980, including the construction of a new surface-level ticket hall and the addition of escalators. Nevertheless, the station retained its original island platform configuration.

Nearby places:
Garnethill
Glasgow Kelvin College
Royal Conservatoire of Scotland
St. Aloysius’ College
Chinatown

There are 500,000 boardings a year at this station.

Past passenger numbers 
 2011/12: 0.459 million annually

References

Glasgow Subway stations
Railway stations in Great Britain opened in 1896
1896 establishments in Scotland
1890s in Glasgow